Porúbka is a village and municipality in the Sobrance District in the Košice Region of east Slovakia.

History
In historical records the village was first mentioned in 1411.

Geography
The village lies at an altitude of 220 metres and covers an area of 10.764 km².
It has a population of about 458 people.

Culture
The village has a public library and a soccer pitch.

External links
 
http://www.statistics.sk/mosmis/eng/run.html
http://en.e-obce.sk/obec/porubka-kosice/porubka.html
https://web.archive.org/web/20120710115048/http://www.porubka-so.sk/

Villages and municipalities in Sobrance District